Puerto Rico Highway 32 (PR-32) is an urban road in Caguas, Puerto Rico. This road goes from PR-1 in Bairoa to PR-172 in Turabo, east of downtown, and it is known as Avenida Luis Muñoz Marín.

Major intersections

See also

 List of highways numbered 32

References

External links
 

032
Caguas, Puerto Rico